Robert Edward "Solly" Solinger (December 23, 1925 – December 10, 2014) was a professional ice hockey player who played 99 games in the National Hockey League. Born in Star City, Saskatchewan, he played for the Toronto Maple Leafs and Detroit Red Wings. He was the first winner of the Dudley "Red" Garrett Memorial Award as rookie of the year in the American Hockey League.

Solinger won the Calder Cup five times during his playing career to share the record for most Calder Cups won with Les Duff, Fred Glover, and Mike Busniuk. He died on December 10, 2014.

Career statistics

Regular season and playoffs

References

External links

1925 births
2014 deaths
Canadian ice hockey left wingers
Cleveland Barons (1937–1973) players
Detroit Red Wings players
Edmonton Flyers (WHL) players
Hershey Bears players
Ice hockey people from Saskatchewan
Los Angeles Blades (WHL) players
Pittsburgh Hornets players
Toronto Maple Leafs players